Russian Theatre may refer to:
 Russian Theatre, Tallinn, Russian theatre in Tallinn, Estonia
 Russian Theatre, Riga, Russian theatre in Riga, Latvia
 Russian Theatre (1766-1769), theatre in Moscow

See also
 Russia Theatre